Question Mark & the Mysterians  is a 1997 eponymous album by the garage rock band ? and the Mysterians, known for their #1 1966 hit "96 Tears". The album was recorded by the original members of the band as a result of their inability to access their masters or re-release their own earlier material, which had passed from the ownership of label Cameo to Allen Klein. It included all of the songs released on their first album, 96 Tears, as well as several other tracks. The rerecorded version of "96 Tears" was subsequently incorporated into compilations.

Background
In the 1960s, Michigan-based band ? & the Mysterians found a regional hit with the song "96 Tears", particularly popular in Texas. The song was originally released on the Pa-Go-Go label, but aggressive offers from several larger distributors resulted in their selling the master to Cameo. Cameo shortened the recording and distributed the single nationally, resulting in a #1 Billboard hit. The band subsequently released several singles and two albums, 96 Tears and Action, on the label. In 1968, the entire catalogue of Cameo-Parkway releases, including those by ? & the Mysterians, were purchased by Allen Klein. Klein refused to permit "96 Tears" to be included on compilations or to permit their albums to be reissued, so in 1997 members of the band, including its vocalist, came together after a studio recording hiatus of several decades to re-record their original songs. The eponymous album was the first of two such re-recordings by the band, who were subsequently able to license their new version of the song for compilations. It would be October 2005 before Klein's company, ABKCO Records, would make a CD of the original releases, The Best of ? & the Mysterians: Cameo Parkway 1966-1967.

Album
The new album included all 12 tracks from the original album 96 Tears, plus an additional four. Two of the tracks, "Smokes" and "Got To", had were included on the band's second album, Action. The other two songs, "Do Something to Me" and "Make You Mine", had been released as singles in 1967 and 1968. In its review, Allmusic notes that although the album is made by the original line-up, the material doesn't sound the same as it did when first released, but adds that "the group sounds tough, dynamic, and exciting...these guys can still kick hard, which is what makes the record worthwhile for die-hard garage freaks."

Track listing
All songs written by Rudy Martinez, except where noted.
"96 Tears" – 3:01
"Midnight Hour" – 2:52
"I Need Somebody" – 2:12
"'8' Teen" – 2:46
"Smokes" – 1:50
"Got To" – 2:38
"Do Something to Me" (Jimmy Calvert, Norman Marzano, Paul Naumann) – 2:32
"Stormy Monday" (traditional) – 3:45
"Up Side" – 2:56
"Don't Break This Heart of Mine" – 2:02
"Ten O'Clock" – 2:24
"Why Me" – 1:45
"You're Telling Me Lies" – 2:29
"Don't Tease Me" – 1:37
"Set Aside" – 2:48
"Make You Mine" – 2:44

Personnel

Musicians
 ? (Rudy Martinez) – vocals 	
 Robert Balderrama – lead guitar
 Frank Lugo – bass guitar	
 Frank Rodriguez – organ
 Robert Martinez – drums

Technical
Chad Cunningham – engineer, producer
Nicole Ruhl Fichera – jacket design
David Graham – arranger
Thomas Kaekel – photography
Stephen Kaplan – photography, production supervisor
Mike Kryger – engineer
Jerry Schollenberger – research
Harry Young – liner notes, research

References

1997 albums
Collectables Records albums
? and the Mysterians albums